Thief of Baghdad is an Indian fantasy adventure TV series that first originally aired on Zee TV between 2000–2001. The show was loosely based on the Arabian Nights story. It was originally intended to run for 48 episodes but it went off-air in June 2001 abruptly due to a conflict between the production house and Zee TV. It was directed by Vijay Pandey, who has earlier directed shows like Sword of Tipu Sultan, Great Maratha, Arth, Des Mein Nikla Hoga Chand and Saat Phere. It was also syndicated on sister channels Zee Next and Zee Smile and Zee Anmol.

Synopsis 
Set in the Middle East during an era of marvellous adventures and magical folk tales as narrated in the Arabian Nights, 'Thief of Baghdad' tells the story of Jafar, a ruthless warlord serving under the command of the evil genie 'Shah Jinn' and his obsession with conquering the entire world to become its undisputed king.

Shortly after invading the city of Baghdad with his army and brutally vanquishing a secret rebellion led by Mukhtar, a spiritual leader and revolutionary, Jafar is informed by Shah Jinn and his sorceress aide Badi about a prospect which can greatly assist him in achieving his seemingly overwhelming objective. Jafar must convince a princess belonging to a peaceful kingdom of fairies to marry him of her own volition in order to gain complete authority and control over the inhabitants of both realms. Immediately, he decides to interrupt the birthday celebration of the beautiful princess Yasmeen and take her away from her kingdom to imprison her in his palace full of grim spells preventing her from escaping back to her home. As the princess begins to develop feelings of despair and anguish, hope appears in the form of a notorious thief known only throughout the city as the 'Thief of Baghdad', a sly and artful hero who steals from the rich to help the poor and oppressed.

One night during an intrusion into Jafar's palace to retrieve a collection of magical items stolen from three visiting merchants, the Thief coincidentally encounters the captive princess and they both recall their romance with each other prior to the events which unfolded with the appearance of Jafar. Realising the severity of the situation and its impact on every inhabitant in both realms, the Thief decides to do whatever he can to stop the tyranny of Jafar and rescue the Princess from his vile grasp.

As the series progresses the Thief and several allies he forms relationships with all have to endure and overcome the dangerous obstacles and ghastly traps Jafar has set to secure his position as the ultimate king of kings.

Cast 
Ahmed aka Thief Of Baghdad – Narendra Jha
Yasmeen – Kim Lasrado
Jafar – Vikrant Chaturvedi
Tugral - Shiva
Abbas - Javed Khan
Masood - Surinder Pal
Qasim - Browney Prasher
Jamal Zardari - Puneetchandra Sharrma
Faridgul - Shailendra Shrivastav
Zareen – Pallavi Solanki
Badi - Zahida Parveen
Neki - Jaya Mathur
Khanam - Asha Bachani
Yusuf Sani - Sunil Nagar
Malika Nasreen - Seema Pandey
Firoz Bakht – Sumit Pathak
Alim Haqqani - Prithvi Zutshi
Azra – Shashi Sharma
Kulsum - Prerna Agarwal
Chitrasen - Radha Kishan
Zahoor Malkooti - Sanjay Batra
Usman - Mukesh Ahuja
Rustam - Master Mohit Makkad
Hakimbaba - Shahnawaz
Raziya - Rajshree

References

External links
 

1999 Indian television series debuts
2000 Indian television series endings
Zee TV original programming
Indian fantasy television series
Works based on One Thousand and One Nights
Indian epic television series
Genies in television
Television series about dragons
Television series set in the Middle East
Works based on Aladdin
Indian period television series